The Explorair Relax MV is a German powered parachute that was designed by Mathias Mauch and produced by Explorair of Ebringen, Breisgau-Hochschwarzwald in Baden-Württemberg. Now out of production, when it was available the aircraft was supplied as a complete ready-to-fly-aircraft.

The aircraft was introduced in about 2002 and production ended when the company went out of business in 2004.

Design and development
The Relax MV was designed to comply with the Fédération Aéronautique Internationale microlight category and the US FAR 103 Ultralight Vehicles rules.

The Relax MV features a  parachute-style wing, single-place accommodation, tricycle landing gear and a single  Explorair-converted Briggs & Stratton four stroke engine in pusher configuration. The aircraft carriage is built from a combination of composite material and bolted aluminium tubing.

The carriage can be converted for use with a hang glider wing as an ultralight trike.

Specifications (Relax MV)

References

Relax
2000s German sport aircraft
2000s German ultralight aircraft
Single-engined pusher aircraft
Powered parachutes
Ultralight trikes